Cordaites is an important genus of extinct gymnosperms which grew on wet ground similar to the Everglades in Florida. Brackish water mussels and crustacea are found frequently between the roots of these trees. The fossils are found in rock sections from the Upper Carboniferous of the Dutch - Belgian - German coal area. A number of many noteworthy types from this line are:
 Cordaites principalis
 Cordaites ludlowi (named after Ludlow, a coal area in England)
 Cordaites hislopii. Found in Paleorrota geopark in Brazil.
In contrast to many other plants, fossilized Cordaites seeds are not rare, because they are rather large (up to 10 mm); those seeds are named Cordaicarpus.

References

External links
https://www.uni-muenster.de/GeoPalaeontologie/Palaeo/Palbot/seite18.html
https://web.archive.org/web/20061109132122/http://museum.gov.ns.ca/fossils/gallery/specimen/967206.htm
http://www.xs4all.nl/~steurh/engcord/ecordai.html
Image of a Cardiocarpus fossil

Cordaitales
Pennsylvanian plants
Prehistoric gymnosperm genera
Conifer genera
Fossils of Georgia (U.S. state)
Paleozoic life of New Brunswick
Paleozoic life of Nova Scotia
Paleozoic life of Prince Edward Island
Paleozoic life of Quebec